Clague is a surname of Manx origin. Notable people with the surname include:

Arthur Clague (1915-1983), Archdeacon of Man (the Isle of Man)
Charles Clague (1890–1962), British-born art director who worked in Hollywood films
Cyril Clague (1880-1946), Manx poet
Sir Douglas Clague (1917-1981), British entrepreneur in Hong Kong
Ewan Clague (1896–1987) American government official and economist
Frank Clague (1865–1952), U.S. Representative from Minnesota
John Clague  (1842 - 1908) Physician and collector of Manx music
John J. Clague (born 1946), Canadian authority in Quaternary and environmental earth sciences
John Clague (1928–2004), American artist and sculptor
Joyce Clague (born 1938), Australian political activist
Kale Clague (born 1998), Canadian professional ice hockey player
Richard Clague (1821–1873), American landscape artist

Also
Mount Clague, British Columbia, Canada
Clague Ridge, Mac. Robertson Land, Antarctica
Clague Garden Estate, a public housing estate in Tsuen Wan, Hong Kong

References

Surnames of Manx origin
Manx-language surnames